The 2020 Schweizer Cup (French: Cup Suisse) was held from August 20 to 23 in Baden, Switzerland. The total purse for the event was 11,000 Swiss francs on both the men's and women's sides.

Similar to the Canada Cup held in Canada, the Schweizer Cup is an annual event where the top teams in Switzerland compete in a round robin and playoff round. Team Peter de Cruz from Geneva opted out of the tournament as they prepared for the Baden Masters the following week.

In the men's event, Andrin Schnider and his team from Schaffhausen took the title in a draw to the button against Yannick Schwaller of Bern. In the bronze medal game, Jan Hess came from behind, scoring four points in the seventh end and stealing one in the eighth to defeat Jan Klossner.

On the women's side of the draw, Elena Stern from Brig-Glis came back from a 4–1 deficit at the half way point to defeat Aarau's Silvana Tirinzoni. Stern also upended Tirinzoni in the final of the 2020 Swiss Women's Curling Championship earlier in the year. Team Irene Schori claimed the bronze medal with a 9–6 win over Raphaela Keiser.

Men

Teams
The teams are listed as follows:

Round-robin standings 
Final round-robin standings

Round-robin results 
All draw times are listed in Central European Time (UTC+02:00).

Draw 1
Thursday, August 20, 6:00 pm

Draw 2
Friday, August 21, 1:00 pm

Draw 3
Friday, August 21, 7:00 pm

Draw 4
Saturday, August 22, 1:00 pm

Draw 5
Saturday, August 22, 7:00 pm

Playoffs

Source:

Semifinals
Sunday, August 23, 12:00 pm

Bronze medal game
Sunday, August 23, 3:30 pm

Final
Sunday, August 23, 3:30 pm

Women

Teams
The teams are listed as follows:

Round-robin standings 
Final round-robin standings

Round-robin results 
All draw times are listed in Central European Time (UTC+02:00).

Draw 1
Thursday, August 20, 3:00 pm

Draw 2
Thursday, August 20, 9:00 pm

Draw 3
Friday, August 21, 10:00 am

Draw 4
Friday, August 21, 5:00 pm

Draw 5
Saturday, August 22, 10:00 am

Draw 6
Saturday, August 22, 5:00 pm

Draw 7
Sunday, August 23, 9:00 am

Playoffs

Source:

Bronze medal game
Sunday, August 23, 3:30 pm

Final
Sunday, August 23, 3:30 pm

References

External links
Men's Event
Women's Event
Men's results (Swiss Curling Association)  
Women's results (Swiss Curling Association) 

2020 in curling
Curling competitions in Switzerland
Baden, Switzerland
August 2020 sports events in Switzerland
2020 in Swiss sport